Sören Hans Brad Opti (born 16 May 1997) is a badminton player from Suriname. He is an Olympian, respresenting Suriname at the 2016 Rio Olympics. He was also selected to represent his country at the 2020 Tokyo Olympic Games, but due to a positive Covid-test had to stay home. In the 2016 Olympics Opti was the flagbearer for Suriname during the opening ceremony. Opti participated at the 2014 and 2018 Central American and Caribbean Games.

Career 
After winning many National and Regional junior titles, he became Surinamese National Champion Men's Singles in 2016 and retained this title in 2017, 2018 and 2019. In 2016 and 2018 he was runner-up at the Carebaco International. In 2016 he reached the semi-finals at the Chile International and the Santo Domingo Open. He competed at the 2016 Rio Summer Olympics. He lost to both Lee Chong Wei of Malaysia and Derek Wong Zi Liang of Singapore during group play and did not advance further.

Opti participated at the 2019 Pan Am Games for Suriname in the Men's Singles and Men's Doubles events. In 2019 he reached the semi-finals in the Men's Doubles category with his doubles partner Mitch Nai Chung Tong at the Carebaco International in Bridgetown, Barbados. At the end of 2019 he joined the Cuntapay Badminton Academy (CBA) in Switzerland. In 2021, Opti received a Tripartite invitation for the 2020 Tokyo Olympics Men's Singles event. For the 2020 Tokyo Olympics Opti was placed by draw in a group with Shi Yuqi from China and Matthew Abela from Malta. However, due to attaining a positive Covid test upon departure to Tokyo, he had to withdraw his participation.

Achievements

National badminton titles

2019 - National Championships : Men's Singles Gold, Men's Doubles Bronze
2018 - National Championships : Men's Singles Gold, Men's Doubles Gold, Mixed Doubles Bronze
2017 - National Championships : Men's Singles Gold
2016 - National Championships : Men's Singles Gold, Men's Doubles Gold
2015 - National Junior Championships : Boys' Singles U19 Gold, Boys' Doubles U19 Gold, Mixed Doubles U19 Gold
2014 - National Championships : Men's Singles Silver, Men's Doubles Bronze, Mixed Doubles Silver
2014 - National Junior Championships : Boys' Singles U19 Gold, Boys' Doubles U19 Gold, Mixed Doubles U19 Gold
2013 - National Championships : Men's Singles Bronze, Men's Doubles Gold, Mixed Doubles Bronze
2013 - National Junior Championships : Boys' Singles U19 Gold, Boys' Doubles U19 Gold, Mixed Doubles U19 Gold
2013 - National Junior Championships : Boys' Singles U17 Gold, Boys' Doubles U17 Gold, Mixed Doubles U17 Gold
2012 - National Junior Championships : Boys' Singles U19 Gold, Boys' Doubles U19 Gold, Mixed Doubles U19 Gold
2012 - National Junior Championships : Boys' Singles U17 Gold, Boys' Doubles U17 Gold, Mixed Doubles U17 Gold
2011 - National Junior Championships : Boys' Singles U19 Gold, Boys' Doubles U19 Gold
2011 - National Junior Championships : Boys' Singles U17 Gold, Boys' Doubles U17 Gold, Mixed Doubles U17 Silver
2011 - National Junior Championships : Boys' Singles U15 Gold, Boys' Doubles U15 Gold, Mixed Doubles U15 Gold
2010 - National Junior Championships : Boys' Singles U19 Bronze
2010 - National Junior Championships : Boys' Singles U15 Gold, Mixed Doubles U15 Gold
2009 - National Junior Championships : Boys' Singles U19 Bronze, Boys' Doubles U19 Silver
2009 - National Junior Championships : Boys' Singles U15 Gold, Boys' Doubles U15 Gold, Mixed Doubles U15 Gold
2008 - National Junior Championships : Boys' Singles U13 Gold, Boys' Doubles U13 Gold, Mixed Doubles U13 Gold
2005 - National Junior Championships : Boys' Singles U11 Gold, Boys' Doubles U11 Gold, Mixed Doubles U11 Gold

6-time badminton athlete of the year in Suriname (2013, 2015, 2016, 2017, 2018 & 2019)
Most Promising Sportman of the year in Suriname 2012

International badminton achievements

2019 - Carebaco International (Barbados) Men's Doubles Bronze Semi-Finalist
2019 - Pan American Games (Lima, Peru) Participant
2018 - CACSO Games (Barranquilla, Colombia) Participant
2018 - Carebaco International (Paramaribo) Men's Singles Silver Finalist
2016 - Santo Domingo Open Men's Singles Bronze Semi-Finalist
2016 - Carebaco International (Oranjestad, Aruba) Men's Singles Silver Finalist
2016 - Carebaco Games (Oranjestad, Aruba) Mixed Team Championships Silver
2016 - 2016 Rio Summer Olympics - Men's Singles (Brazil) Participant
2016 - Chile International Men's Singles Bronze Semi-Finalist
2015 - BWF World Junior Championships (Lima, Peru) Participant
2015 - Carebaco Junior International  (Santo Domingo) U19 Boys' Singles Gold Winner & U19 Boys' Doubles Silver Finalist 
2015 - Carebaco Games Junior (Santo Domingo) U19 Boys' Singles Silver Finalist, U19 Boys' Doubles Gold Winner 
2015 - Peru Junior U19 International (Lima) U19 Boys' Singles Bronze Semi-Finalist 
2014 - CACSO Games (Veracruz, Mexico) Participant
2014 - Suriname International (Paramaribo) Men's Doubles Bronze Semi-Finalist
2013 - Suriname International (Paramaribo) Men's Doubles Bronze Semi-Finalist & Mixed Doubles Bronze Semi-Finalist
2013 - South American Youth Games (Lima, Peru) U19 Boys' Singles Bronze Semi-Finalist & U19 Mixed Doubles Bronze Semi-Finalist  
2013 - Carebaco Games Junior  (San Juan, Puerto Rico) U17 Boys' Singles Silver Finalist, U17 Boys' Doubles Silver Finalist & U17 Mixed Doubles Gold Winner
2012 - South American Junior Championships (Lima, Peru) U17 Boys' Singles Bronze Semi-Finalist & U17 Boys' Doubles Silver Finalist
2012 - Carebaco Games Junior (Santo Domingo) U17 Boys' Singles Bronze Semi-Finalist, U17 Boys' Doubles Silver Finalist & U17 Mixed Doubles Silver Finalist
2012 - Carebaco Games Junior (Santo Domingo) Mixed Team Junior Championships Bronze 
2012 - Junior Master Gulicktoernooi (Tegelen, the Netherlands) U17 Boys' Singles Gold Winner, U17 Boys' Doubles Gold Winner & U17 Mixed Doubles Gold Winner
2012 - Junior Master BCRS (Spijkenisse, the Netherlands) U17 Boys' Singles Gold Winner, U19 Boys' Doubles Silver Finalist & U17 Mixed Doubles Gold Winner
2011 - Carebaco Games Junior (Barbados) U15 Boys' Singles Gold Winner, U15 Boys' Doubles Gold Winner & U15 Mixed Doubles Gold Winner
2011 - Carebaco Games Junior (Barbados) Mixed Team Junior Championships Silver 
2010 - Suriname International (Paramaribo) Men's Doubles Bronze Semi-Finalist
2008 - Pan Am Junior Badminton Championships (Guatemala) U15 Boys' Doubles Bronze Semi-Finalist
2008 - Suriname Junior International (Paramaribo) U13 Boys' Singles Gold Winner, U13 Boys' Doubles Gold Winner,  U13 Mixed Doubles Gold Winner,  U15 Boys' Singles Silver Finalist & U15 Boys' Doubles Gold Winner
2006 - Pan Am Junior Badminton Championships (Campinas, Brazil) U11 Boys' Singles Silver Finalist & U11 Boys' Doubles Bronze Semi-Finalist

Achievements with results

BWF International Challenge/Series (2 runners-up) 
Men's singles

 BWF International Challenge tournament
 BWF International Series tournament
 BWF Future Series tournament

BWF Junior International (1 title, 1 runners-up) 
Boys' singles

Boys' doubles

  BWF Junior International Grand Prix tournament
  BWF Junior International Challenge tournament
  BWF Junior International Series tournament
  BWF Junior Future Series tournament

References

External links
 
 

Surinamese male badminton players
1997 births
Living people
Sportspeople from Paramaribo
Badminton players at the 2016 Summer Olympics
Olympic badminton players of Suriname
Badminton players at the 2019 Pan American Games
Pan American Games competitors for Suriname
Competitors at the 2014 Central American and Caribbean Games
Competitors at the 2018 Central American and Caribbean Games